Lilicub is a French band that was founded in 1992, mainly known for its 1996 hit "Voyage en Italie".

Biography
The group was originally a trio composed of Catherine Dirand, Benoît Carré (actress Isabelle Carré's brother) and Philippe Zavriew. Benoît met Catherine at a jazz festival in Ampthill. In late 1993, they signed with the label Remark and released their first single entitled Au bout du compte early 1995. Their second single "Voyage in Italie" ensured their reputation placing at #7 on the French SNEP Top 50 during the 1996 summer.

Lilicub was nominated at the 1997 Victoires de la Musique in the category "Revelation of the year", and awarded the price Sacem Roger Seiller for "Best French group" in 1998. The same year, Lilicub released its second album, La Grande Vacance. The group then engaged in collaborations with Japanese artists like Taeko Onuki et Noriko Kato. The third album entitled Zoom was produced as a film and was released in 2001. In 2005, the band began a tour across France to promote its new songs.

Discography

Albums
 1996 : Voyage en Italie
 1997 : A Tribute to Antônio Carlos Jobim
 1998 : La Grande Vacance
 1999 : La Douce Vie
 2000 : À la Nouvelle Vague
 2001 : Tribute to Polnareff
 2001 : Zoom 
 2002 : Boby Tutti-Frutti - L'hommage délicieux à Boby Lapointe
 2003 : L'Humeur vagabonde : hommage à Jeanne Moreau
 2008 : Papa a fait Mai 68

Singles
 1996 : "Voyage en Italie" - #7 in France
 1996 : "Faire fi de tout" - #30 in France

References

External links
Official website

French pop music groups
Musical groups established in 1992